The Fiji National Rugby League (FNRL) is the governing body for rugby league in Fiji. They are based in the capital Suva.

History
The FNRL were founded in 1992 and have been full members of the Rugby League International Federation since its formation in 1998. They have also been a full member of the Asia-Pacific Rugby League Confederation since its formation in 2010.

See also

Rugby league in Fiji
Fiji National Rugby League Competition
Fiji national rugby league team
Fiji women's national rugby league team

References

External links

Rugby league in Fiji
Rugby league governing bodies in Oceania
Sports organizations established in 1992